Kribul (old version: Krabul) is a village in Southwestern Bulgaria. It is located in the Satovcha Municipality, Blagoevgrad Province.

Kribul Hill on Trinity Peninsula in Antarctica is named after the village.

Geography 

The village of Kribul is located in the Western Rhodope Mountains. It belongs to the Chech region.

History 

In the vicinity of Kribul after archeological research were found the remains of a late medieval church.

In 1873 Kribul (Kraboul) had male population of 140 Pomaks and 50 houses. According to Vasil Kanchov, in 1900, Kribul (Крабулъ) was populated by 550 Bulgarian Muslims According to Stefan Verković at the end of the 19th century the village had male population of 180 Pomaks and 50 houses.

Religions 

The population is Muslim.

Notes 

Villages in Blagoevgrad Province
Chech